The inferior vena cava is a large vein that carries the deoxygenated blood from the lower and middle body into the right atrium of the heart. It is formed by the joining of the right and the left common iliac veins, usually at the level of the fifth lumbar vertebra.

The inferior vena cava is the lower ("inferior") of the two venae cavae, the two large veins that carry deoxygenated blood from the body to the right atrium of the heart: the inferior vena cava carries blood from the lower half of the body whilst the superior vena cava carries blood from the upper half of the body. Together, the venae cavae (in addition to the coronary sinus, which carries blood from the muscle of the heart itself) form the venous counterparts of the aorta.

It is a large retroperitoneal vein that lies posterior to the abdominal cavity and runs along the right side of the vertebral column. It enters the right auricle at the lower right, back side of the heart.

Structure
The IVC is formed by the joining of the left and right common iliac veins and brings collected blood into the right atrium of the heart. It also joins with the azygos vein (which runs on the right side of the vertebral column) and venous plexuses next to the spinal cord. 

The inferior vena cava begins as the left and right common iliac veins behind the abdomen unite, at about the level of L5. It passes through the thoracic diaphragm at the caval opening at the level of T8 - T9. It passes to the right of the descending aorta.

Tributaries
The specific levels of the tributaries are as follows:

Because the inferior vena cava is located to the right of the midline, drainage of the tributaries is not always symmetrical. On the right, the gonadal veins and suprarenal veins drain into the inferior vena cava directly. On the left, they drain into the renal vein which in turn drains into the inferior vena cava. By contrast, all the lumbar veins and hepatic veins usually drain directly into the inferior vena cava.

Development
In the embryo, the inferior vena cava and right auricle are separated by the valve of the inferior vena cava, also known as the Eustachian valve. In the adult, this valve typically has totally regressed or remains as a small fold of endocardium.

Variation
Rarely, the inferior vena cava may vary in its size and position. In transposition of the great arteries the inferior vena cava may lie on the left.

In between 0.2% to 0.3% of people, the inferior vena cava may be duplicated beneath the level of the renal veins.

Function
The inferior vena cava is a vein. It carries deoxygenated blood from the lower half of the body to the right atrium of the heart.

The corresponding vein that carries deoxygenated blood from the upper half of the body is the superior vena cava.

Clinical significance
Health problems attributed to the IVC are most often associated with it being compressed (ruptures are rare because it has a low intraluminal pressure). Typical sources of external pressure are an enlarged aorta (abdominal aortic aneurysm), the gravid uterus (aortocaval compression syndrome) and abdominal malignancies, such as colorectal cancer, renal cell carcinoma and ovarian cancer.  Since the inferior vena cava is primarily a right-sided structure, unconscious pregnant women should be turned on to their left side (the recovery position), to relieve pressure on it and facilitate venous return.  In rare cases, straining associated with defecation can lead to restricted blood flow through the IVC and result in syncope (fainting).

Blockage of the inferior vena cava is rare and is treated urgently as a life-threatening condition. It is associated with deep vein thrombosis, IVC filters, liver transplantation and surgical procedures such as the insertion of a catheter in the femoral vein in the groin.

Trauma to the vena cava is usually fatal as unstoppable excessive blood loss occurs.

Additional images

See also
 Atriocaval shunt
 Inferior vena cava syndrome
 Recovery position

References

External links
  - "Posterior Abdominal Wall: Tributaries to the Inferior Vena Cava"
 

Veins of the torso